Vermiform (ˈvərməˌfôrm) describes something shaped like a worm. The expression is often employed in biology and anatomy to describe usually soft body parts or animals that are more or less tubular or cylindrical. The word root is Latin, vermes (worms) and formes (shaped).  A well known example is the vermiform appendix, a small, blind section of the gut in humans and a number of other mammals.

A number of soft-bodied animal phyla are typically described as vermiform. The better-known ones are undoubtedly the annelids (earthworm and relatives) and the roundworms (a very common, mainly parasitic group), but a number of less-well-known phyla answer to the same description. Examples range from the minute parasitic mesozoans to the larger-bodied free-living phyla like ribbon worms, peanut worms, and priapulids.

References

Anatomy